Thomas T. Yeatman Sr. (1787–1833) was the owner of an iron foundry and was a prominent cotton trader, banker, steamboat owner, and commission business partner in Nashville, Tennessee. His son James E. Yeatman had a charitable career and business career in St. Louis, Missouri. Another son, Thomas Yeatman Jr., continued in the cotton business.

Yeatman's father was a boatbuilder in Brownsville, Pennsylvania.

Yeatman remarried after his first wife died. After his death, his second wife married John Bell, who would run for U.S. president.

References

1787 births
1833 deaths
People from Nashville, Tennessee
American bankers
19th-century American businesspeople